Oleksandr Lytvynenko (March 21, 1977 – May 2008) was a Ukrainian sprint canoeist who competed in the mid-1990s. At the 1996 Summer Olympics in Atlanta, he was eliminated in the semifinals of both the C-2 500 m and the C-2 1000 m events.

References
Oleksandr Lytvynenko's profile at Sports Reference.com
Mention of Oleksandr Lytvynenko's death 

1977 births
2008 deaths
Canoeists at the 1996 Summer Olympics
Olympic canoeists of Ukraine
Ukrainian male canoeists